A boomtown is a community that experiences sudden and rapid population and economic growth.

Boomtown or Boom Town may also refer to:

Places
 Boomtown Historic District, a neighborhood in Martinsburg, West Virginia

Enterprises
 Boomtown, Inc., a former gaming company in Verdi, Nevada
 Boomtown Bossier City, a hotel and casino located in Louisiana (formerly known as Casino Magic Bossier City)
 Silverton (hotel and casino), formerly known as Boomtown Las Vegas
 Boomtown New Orleans, a hotel and casino located in Harvey, Louisiana (formerly known as Boomtown Westbank)
 Boomtown Reno, a hotel and casino located in Verdi, Nevada

Art, entertainment, and media

Books 

 Boom Town (book), a 1998 picture book by Sonia Levitin

Events
 Boomtown (festival) (formerly Boomtown Fair), an annual festival held near Winchester, United Kingdom
 Boomtown Film and Music Festival, in Southeast Texas

Films
 Boom Town (film), a 1940 adventure drama Hollywood film starring Clark Gable

Podcasts 

 Boomtown (podcast), 2019 audio documentary produced by Texas Monthly

Music

Labels
 Boomtown Records, an Australian independent record label founded by Jaddan Comerford

Albums
 Boomtown (Andrew Cash album), the second studio album released by Canadian roots rock singer Andrew Cash
 Boomtown (David & David album), 1986
 Boomtown (Ozma album), the fifth studio album released by American rock band Ozma
 Boomtown (Toby Keith album), the second studio album released by American country music singer Toby Keith

Bands
The Boomtown Rats, an Irish new wave band

Television
 Boomtown (1956 TV series), an American weekend children's television program on WBZ-TV in Boston, Massachusetts
 "Boomtown", a 2000 episode of the Canadian-German science fiction television series Lexx
 Boomtown (2002 TV series), an American action/drama television series broadcast by NBC
 "Boom Town" (Doctor Who), a 2005 episode of the British science fiction television series Doctor Who
 Boom Town (2013 TV series), a British structured reality television series shown on BBC Three
 Boomtown, a recurring character from the television series Letterkenny